"" ("Lullaby"; "Cradle Song"), Op. 49, No. 4, is a lied for voice and piano by Johannes Brahms which was first published in 1868. It is one of the composer's most popular pieces.

History
Brahms based the music of his "Wiegenlied" partially on "S'Is Anderscht", a duet by  published in the 1840s. The cradle song was dedicated to Brahms's friend, Bertha Faber, on the occasion of the birth of her second son. Brahms had been in love with her in her youth and constructed the melody of the "" to suggest, as a hidden counter-melody, a song she used to sing to him. Simrock published Brahms's Op. 49 in November 1868. The lullaby was first performed in public on 22 December 1869 in Vienna by Luise Dustmann (singer) and Clara Schumann (piano).

Song
The song has been described as deceptively simple. In its original publication it only had a single verse.

Lyrics
The lyrics are from Des Knaben Wunderhorn, a collection of German folk poems:

Later, Brahms adapted a second verse from an 1849 poem by :

Melody

In 1877, Brahms based the second theme of the first movement of his Second Symphony on the lullaby's tune. The melody is first introduced in bar 82 and continues to develop throughout the movement.

Reception
The "" is one of Brahms's most popular songs.

Arrangements

In 1922, Australian pianist and composer Percy Grainger arranged the "" as one of his "Free Settings of Favorite Melodies" for solo piano. This study was characterized by much use of suspensions and arpeggiation, with the first statement of the melody placed in the tenor range of the keyboard. This last practice was a favorite one of Grainger.

Cultural references
A 1936 biographical film of Brahms with Albert Florath as the composer, took its title from the opening lines of this song, Guten Abend, gute Nacht.

Wendy Cope's poem "Brahms Cradle Song" refers to this song.

Cultural interpretations
In an article published in 2005, Karen Bottge analysed Brahms's "Wiegenlied" as an expression of the maternal voice, basing her reflections on writings by theorists such as Friedrich Kittler, Michel Chion, Gilles Deleuze, Félix Guattari, and Theodor W. Adorno.

Recordings
Recordings include:
 1958 Joni James – recorded for her album Among My Souvenirs.
 1962 Elisabeth Schwarzkopf (soprano) and Gerald Moore on Testament Records (UK) 1206.
 1989 Anne Sofie von Otter (mezzo-soprano) and Bengt Forsberg (piano) on Deutsche Grammophon 429727.
 1994 Kenny G – recorded as instrumental "Brahms Lullaby" for his album Miracles: The Holiday Album.
 2013 Bernarda Fink (mezzo-soprano) and Roger Vignoles (piano).

Notes

References

Sources

External links

Lieder composed by Johannes Brahms
Lullabies
1868 songs